The 62nd Indian Infantry Brigade was an Infantry formation of the Indian Army during World War II. It was formed in November 1943, and assigned to the 19th Indian Infantry Division The brigade fought in the Burma Campaign and remained with the 19th Division until the end of the war.

Formation
4th Battalion, 6th Queen Elizabeth's Own Gurkha Rifles November 1941 to August 1945
4th Battalion, 4th Gurkha Rifles November 1941 to September 1943
7th battalion, 2nd Punjab Regiment November 1941 to August 1942
2nd Battalion, Welch Regiment August 1942 to August 1945
3rd Battalion, 6th Rajputana Rifles September 1943 to August 1945
1st Battalion, 6th Queen Elizabeth's Own Gurkha Rifles November to December 1944 and January to February 1945
1st Battalion, Assam Regiment January to February 1945
2nd Battalion, Royal Berkshire Regiment July to August 1945

See also

 List of Indian Army Brigades in World War II

References

British Indian Army brigades
Military units and formations in Burma in World War II